Sam Deroo (born 29 April 1992) is a Belgian professional volleyball player. He is a member of the Belgium national team, and the 2013 European League winner. At the professional club level, he plays for Zenit Kazan.

Career

Clubs
On 22 May 2015, Deroo signed a contract with ZAKSA Kędzierzyn-Koźle. On 26 April 2016, he won his first title of the Polish Champion. In May 2016, he extended his contract until 2017.

Honours

Clubs
 CEV Cup
  2020/2021 – with Dynamo Moscow
 National championships
 2010/2011  Belgian SuperCup, with Knack Roeselare
 2010/2011  Belgian Cup, with Knack Roeselare
 2015/2016  Polish Championship, with ZAKSA Kędzierzyn-Koźle
 2016/2017  Polish Cup, with ZAKSA Kędzierzyn-Koźle
 2016/2017  Polish Championship, with ZAKSA Kędzierzyn-Koźle
 2018/2019  Polish Cup, with ZAKSA Kędzierzyn-Koźle
 2018/2019  Polish Championship, with ZAKSA Kędzierzyn-Koźle
 2018/2019  Emir Cup, with Al Rayyan
 2020/2021  Russian Cup, with Dynamo Moscow
 2020/2021  Russian Championship, with Dynamo Moscow

References

External links

 
 Player profile at LegaVolley.it    
 Player profile at PlusLiga.pl   
 Player profile at Volleybox.net

1992 births
Living people
People from Beveren
Sportspeople from East Flanders
Belgian men's volleyball players
Belgian expatriate sportspeople in Italy
Expatriate volleyball players in Italy
Belgian expatriate sportspeople in Poland
Expatriate volleyball players in Poland
Belgian expatriate sportspeople in Russia
Expatriate volleyball players in Russia
Modena Volley players
Blu Volley Verona players
ZAKSA Kędzierzyn-Koźle players
Resovia (volleyball) players
VC Zenit Kazan players
Outside hitters